Reginald Bedford Hammond (10 September 1894 – 1 October 1970) was a New Zealand surveyor, architect, town planner and senior public servant. He was born in Te Kōpuru, Northland, New Zealand on 10 September 1894.

References

1894 births
1970 deaths
New Zealand architects
New Zealand public servants
New Zealand surveyors
People from the Northland Region